Edward Kar (born 12 August 1954) is a Liberian middle-distance runner. He competed in the men's 1500 metres at the 1972 Summer Olympics.

References

1954 births
Living people
Athletes (track and field) at the 1972 Summer Olympics
Liberian male middle-distance runners
Olympic athletes of Liberia
Place of birth missing (living people)